In philosophy, systems theory, science, and art, emergence occurs when an entity is observed to have properties its parts do not have on their own, properties or behaviors that emerge only when the parts interact in a wider whole.

Emergence plays a central role in theories of integrative levels and of complex systems. For instance, the phenomenon of life as studied in biology is an emergent property of chemistry.

In philosophy, theories that emphasize emergent properties have been called emergentism.

In philosophy

Philosophers often understand emergence as a claim about the etiology of a system's properties. An emergent property of a system, in this context, is one that is not a property of any component of that system, but is still a feature of the system as a whole. Nicolai Hartmann (1882–1950), one of the first modern philosophers to write on emergence, termed this a categorial novum (new category).

Definitions
This concept of emergence dates from at least the time of Aristotle. The many scientists and philosophers who have written on the concept include John Stuart Mill (Composition of Causes, 1843) and Julian Huxley (1887–1975).

The philosopher G. H. Lewes coined the term "emergent" in 1875, distinguishing it from the merely "resultant":

Every resultant is either a sum or a difference of the co-operant forces; their sum, when their directions are the same – their difference, when their directions are contrary. Further, every resultant is clearly traceable in its components, because these are homogeneous and commensurable. It is otherwise with emergents, when, instead of adding measurable motion to measurable motion, or things of one kind to other individuals of their kind, there is a co-operation of things of unlike kinds. The emergent is unlike its components insofar as these are incommensurable, and it cannot be reduced to their sum or their difference.

In 1999 economist Jeffrey Goldstein provided a current definition of emergence in the journal Emergence. Goldstein initially defined emergence as: "the arising of novel and coherent structures, patterns and properties during the process of self-organization in complex systems".

In 2002 systems scientist Peter Corning described the qualities of Goldstein's definition in more detail:

The common characteristics are: (1) radical novelty (features not previously observed in systems); (2) coherence or correlation (meaning integrated wholes that maintain themselves over some period of time); (3) A global or macro "level" (i.e. there is some property of "wholeness"); (4) it is the product of a dynamical process (it evolves); and (5) it is "ostensive" (it can be perceived).

Corning suggests a narrower definition, requiring that the components be unlike in kind (following Lewes), and that they involve division of labor between these components. He also says that living systems (comparably to the game of chess), while emergent, cannot be reduced to underlying laws of emergence:

Strong and weak emergence
Usage of the notion "emergence" may generally be subdivided into two perspectives, that of "weak emergence" and "strong emergence". One paper discussing this division is Weak Emergence, by philosopher Mark Bedau. In terms of physical systems, weak emergence is a type of emergence in which the emergent property is amenable to computer simulation or similar forms of after-the-fact analysis (for example, the formation of a traffic jam, the structure of a flock of starlings in flight or a school of fish, or the formation of galaxies). Crucial in these simulations is that the interacting members retain their independence. If not, a new entity is formed with new, emergent properties: this is called strong emergence, which it is argued cannot be simulated, analysed or reduced.

Some common points between the two notions are that emergence concerns new properties produced as the system grows, which is to say ones which are not shared with its components or prior states. Also, it is assumed that the properties are supervenient rather than metaphysically primitive.

Weak emergence describes new properties arising in systems as a result of the interactions at a fundamental level. However, Bedau stipulates that the properties can be determined only by observing or simulating the system, and not by any process of a reductionist analysis. As a consequence the emerging properties are scale dependent: they are only observable if the system is large enough to exhibit the phenomenon. Chaotic, unpredictable behaviour can be seen as an emergent phenomenon, while at a microscopic scale the behaviour of the constituent parts can be fully deterministic.

Bedau notes that weak emergence is not a universal metaphysical solvent, as the hypothesis that consciousness is weakly emergent would not resolve the traditional philosophical questions about the physicality of consciousness. However, Bedau concludes that adopting this view would provide a precise notion that emergence is involved in consciousness, and second, the notion of weak emergence is metaphysically benign.

Strong emergence describes the direct causal action of a high-level system upon its components; qualities produced this way are irreducible to the system's constituent parts. The whole is other than the sum of its parts. It is argued then that no simulation of the system can exist, for such a simulation would itself constitute a reduction of the system to its constituent parts. Physics lacks well-established examples of strong emergence, unless it is interpreted as the impossibility in practice to explain the whole in terms of the parts. Practical impossibility may be a more useful distinction than one in principle, since it is easier to determine and quantify, and does not imply the use of mysterious forces, but simply reflects the limits of our capability.

Rejecting the distinction
However, biologist Peter Corning has asserted that "the debate about whether or not the whole can be predicted from the properties of the parts misses the point. Wholes produce unique combined effects, but many of these effects may be co-determined by the context and the interactions between the whole and its environment(s)". In accordance with his Synergism Hypothesis, Corning also stated: "It is the synergistic effects produced by wholes that are the very cause of the evolution of complexity in nature." Novelist Arthur Koestler used the metaphor of Janus (a symbol of the unity underlying complements like open/shut, peace/war) to illustrate how the two perspectives (strong vs. weak or holistic vs. reductionistic) should be treated as non-exclusive, and should work together to address the issues of emergence. Theoretical physicist PW Anderson states it this way:

Viability of strong emergence
Some thinkers question the plausibility of strong emergence as contravening our usual understanding of physics. Mark A. Bedau observes:

Strong emergence can be criticized for leading to causal overdetermination. The canonical example concerns emergent mental states (M and M∗) that supervene on physical states (P and P∗) respectively. Let M and M∗ be emergent properties. Let M∗ supervene on base property P∗. What happens when M causes M∗? Jaegwon Kim says:

If M is the cause of M∗, then M∗ is overdetermined because M∗ can also be thought of as being determined by P. One escape-route that a strong emergentist could take would be to deny downward causation. However, this would remove the proposed reason that emergent mental states must supervene on physical states, which in turn would call physicalism into question, and thus be unpalatable for some philosophers and physicists.

Meanwhile, others have worked towards developing analytical evidence of strong emergence. In 2009, Gu et al. presented a class of infinite physical systems that exhibits non-computable macroscopic properties. More precisely, if one could compute certain macroscopic properties of these systems from the microscopic description of these systems, then one would be able to solve computational problems known to be undecidable in computer science. These results concern infinite systems, finite systems being considered computable. However, macroscopic concepts which only apply in the limit of infinite systems, such as phase transitions and the renormalization group, are important for understanding and modeling real, finite physical systems. Gu et al. concluded that

Emergence and interaction
Emergent structures are patterns that emerge via the collective actions of many individual entities. To explain such patterns, one might conclude, per Aristotle, that emergent structures are more than the sum of their parts on the assumption that the emergent order will not arise if the various parts simply act independently of one another. However, there are those who disagree. According to this argument, the interaction of each part with its immediate surroundings causes a complex chain of processes that can lead to order in some form. In fact, some systems in nature are observed to exhibit emergence based upon the interactions of autonomous parts, and some others exhibit emergence that at least at present cannot be reduced in this way. In particular renormalization methods in theoretical physics enable scientists to study systems that are not tractable as the combination of their parts.

Objective or subjective quality
Crutchfield regards the properties of complexity and organization of any system as subjective qualities determined by the observer.

Defining structure and detecting the emergence of complexity in nature are inherently subjective, though essential, scientific activities. Despite the difficulties, these problems can be analysed in terms of how model-building observers infer from measurements the computational capabilities embedded in non-linear processes. An observer’s notion of what is ordered, what is random, and what is complex in its environment depends directly on its computational resources: the amount of raw measurement data, of memory, and of time available for estimation and inference. The discovery of structure in an environment depends more critically and subtly, though, on how those resources are organized. The descriptive power of the observer’s chosen (or implicit) computational model class, for example, can be an overwhelming determinant in finding regularity in data.

On the other hand, Peter Corning argues: "Must the synergies be perceived/observed in order to qualify as emergent effects, as some theorists claim? Most emphatically not. The synergies associated with emergence are real and measurable, even if nobody is there to observe them."

The low entropy of an ordered system can be viewed as an example of subjective emergence: the observer sees an ordered system by ignoring the underlying microstructure (i.e. movement of molecules or elementary particles) and concludes that the system has a low entropy.
On the other hand, chaotic, unpredictable behaviour can also be seen as subjective emergent, while at a microscopic scale the movement of the constituent parts can be fully deterministic.

In religion, art and humanities
In religion, emergence grounds expressions of religious naturalism and syntheism in which a sense of the sacred is perceived in the workings of entirely naturalistic processes by which more complex forms arise or evolve from simpler forms. Examples are detailed in The Sacred Emergence of Nature by Ursula Goodenough & Terrence Deacon and Beyond Reductionism: Reinventing the Sacred by Stuart Kauffman, both from 2006, as well as Syntheism – Creating God in The Internet Age by Alexander Bard & Jan Söderqvist from 2014 and Emergentism: A Religion of Complexity for the Metamodern World by Brendan Graham Dempsey (2022). An early argument (1904–05) for the emergence of social formations, in part stemming from religion, can be found in Max Weber's most famous work, The Protestant Ethic and the Spirit of Capitalism. Recently, the emergence of a new social system is linked with the emergence of order from nonlinear relationships among multiple interacting units, where multiple interacting units are individual thoughts, consciousness, and actions.

In art, emergence is used to explore the origins of novelty, creativity, and authorship. Some art/literary theorists (Wheeler, 2006;  Alexander, 2011) have proposed alternatives to postmodern understandings of "authorship" using the complexity sciences and emergence theory. They contend that artistic selfhood and meaning are emergent, relatively objective phenomena. Michael J. Pearce has used emergence to describe the experience of works of art in relation to contemporary neuroscience. Practicing artist Leonel Moura, in turn, attributes to his "artbots" a real, if nonetheless rudimentary, creativity based on emergent principles. In literature and linguistics, the concept of emergence has been applied in the domain of stylometry to explain the interrelation between the syntactical structures of the text and the author style (Slautina, Marusenko, 2014).

In international development, concepts of emergence have been used within a theory of social change termed SEED-SCALE to show how standard principles interact to bring forward socio-economic development fitted to cultural values, community economics, and natural environment (local solutions emerging from the larger socio-econo-biosphere). These principles can be implemented utilizing a sequence of standardized tasks that self-assemble in individually specific ways utilizing recursive evaluative criteria.

In postcolonial studies, the term "Emerging Literature" refers to a contemporary body of texts that is gaining momentum in the global literary landscape (v. esp.: J.M. Grassin, ed. Emerging Literatures, Bern, Berlin, etc. : Peter Lang, 1996). By opposition, "emergent literature" is rather a concept used in the theory of literature.

Emergent properties and processes
An emergent behavior or emergent property can appear when a number of simple entities (agents) operate in an environment, forming more complex behaviors as a collective. If emergence happens over disparate size scales, then the reason is usually a causal relation across different scales. In other words, there is often a form of top-down feedback in systems with emergent properties. The processes causing emergent properties may occur in either the observed or observing system, and are commonly identifiable by their patterns of accumulating change, generally called 'growth'. Emergent behaviours can occur because of intricate causal relations across different scales and feedback, known as interconnectivity. The emergent property itself may be either very predictable or unpredictable and unprecedented, and represent a new level of the system's evolution. The complex behaviour or properties are not a property of any single such entity, nor can they easily be predicted or deduced from behaviour in the lower-level entities. The shape and behaviour of a flock of birds or school of fish are good examples of emergent properties.

One reason emergent behaviour is hard to predict is that the number of interactions between a system's components increases exponentially with the number of components, thus allowing for many new and subtle types of behaviour to emerge. Emergence is often a product of particular patterns of interaction. Negative feedback introduces constraints that serve to fix structures or behaviours. In contrast, positive feedback promotes change, allowing local variations to grow into global patterns. Another way in which interactions lead to emergent properties is dual-phase evolution. This occurs where interactions are applied intermittently, leading to two phases: one in which patterns form or grow, the other in which they are refined or removed.

On the other hand, merely having a large number of interactions is not enough by itself to guarantee emergent behaviour; many of the interactions may be negligible or irrelevant, or may cancel each other out. In some cases, a large number of interactions can in fact hinder the emergence of interesting behaviour, by creating a lot of "noise" to drown out any emerging "signal"; the emergent behaviour may need to be temporarily isolated from other interactions before it reaches enough critical mass to self-support. Thus it is not just the sheer number of connections between components which encourages emergence; it is also how these connections are organised. A hierarchical organisation is one example that can generate emergent behaviour (a bureaucracy may behave in a way quite different from the individual departments of that bureaucracy); but emergent behaviour can also arise from more decentralized organisational structures, such as a marketplace. In some cases, the system has to reach a combined threshold of diversity, organisation, and connectivity before emergent behaviour appears.

Unintended consequences and side effects are closely related to emergent properties. Luc Steels writes: "A component has a particular functionality but this is not recognizable as a subfunction of the global functionality. Instead a component implements a behaviour whose side effect contributes to the global functionality ... Each behaviour has a side effect and the sum of the side effects gives the desired functionality." In other words, the global or macroscopic functionality of a system with "emergent functionality" is the sum of all "side effects", of all emergent properties and functionalities.

Systems with emergent properties or emergent structures may appear to defy entropic principles and the second law of thermodynamics, because they form and increase order despite the lack of command and central control. This is possible because open systems can extract information and order out of the environment.

Emergence helps to explain why the fallacy of division is a fallacy.

Emergent structures in nature

Emergent structures can be found in many natural phenomena, from the physical to the biological domain. For example, the shape of weather phenomena such as hurricanes are emergent structures. The development and growth of complex, orderly crystals, as driven by the random motion of water molecules within a conducive natural environment, is another example of an emergent process, where randomness can give rise to complex and deeply attractive, orderly structures.
 However, crystalline structure and hurricanes are said to have a self-organizing phase.

It is useful to distinguish three forms of emergent structures. A first-order emergent structure occurs as a result of shape interactions (for example, hydrogen bonds in water molecules lead to surface tension). A second-order emergent structure involves shape interactions played out sequentially over time (for example, changing atmospheric conditions as a snowflake falls to the ground build upon and alter its form). Finally, a third-order emergent structure is a consequence of shape, time, and heritable instructions. For example, an organism's genetic code affects the form of the organism's systems in space and time.

Nonliving, physical systems
In physics, emergence is used to describe a property, law, or phenomenon which occurs at macroscopic scales (in space or time) but not at microscopic scales, despite the fact that a macroscopic system can be viewed as a very large ensemble of microscopic systems.

An emergent property need not be more complicated than the underlying non-emergent properties which generate it. For instance, the laws of thermodynamics are remarkably simple, even if the laws which govern the interactions between component particles are complex. The term emergence in physics is thus used not to signify complexity, but rather to distinguish which laws and concepts apply to macroscopic scales, and which ones apply to microscopic scales.

However, another, perhaps more broadly applicable way to conceive of the emergent divide does involve a dose of complexity insofar as the computational feasibility of going from the microscopic to the macroscopic property tells the 'strength' of the emergence. This is better understood given the following definition of (weak) emergence that comes from physics:

An emergent behavior of a physical system is a qualitative property that can only occur in the limit that the number of microscopic constituents tends to infinity.

Since there are no actually infinite systems in the real world, there is no obvious naturally occurring notion of a hard separation between the properties of the constituents of a system and those of the emergent whole. As discussed below, classical mechanics is thought to be emergent from quantum mechanics, though in principle, quantum dynamics fully describes everything happening at a classical level. However, it would take a computer larger than the size of the universe with more computing time than life time of the universe to describe the motion of a falling apple in terms of the locations of its electrons ; thus we can take this to be a "strong" emergent divide.

In the case of strong emergence, the number of constituents can be much smaller. F.i. the emergent properties of a H2O molecule are very different from its constituent parts oxygen and hydrogen.

Some examples include:
Classical mechanics
 The laws of classical mechanics can be said to emerge as a limiting case from the rules of quantum mechanics applied to large enough masses. This is particularly strange since quantum mechanics is generally thought of as more complicated than classical mechanics.
Friction
 Forces between elementary particles are conservative. However, friction emerges when considering more complex structures of matter, whose surfaces can convert mechanical energy into heat energy when rubbed against each other. Similar considerations apply to other emergent concepts in continuum mechanics such as viscosity, elasticity, tensile strength, etc.
Patterned ground
 the distinct, and often symmetrical geometric shapes formed by ground material in periglacial regions.
Statistical mechanics
 initially derived using the concept of a large enough ensemble that fluctuations about the most likely distribution can be all but ignored. However, small clusters do not exhibit sharp first order phase transitions such as melting, and at the boundary it is not possible to completely categorize the cluster as a liquid or solid, since these concepts are (without extra definitions) only applicable to macroscopic systems.  Describing a system using statistical mechanics methods is much simpler than using a low-level atomistic approach.
Electrical networks
 The bulk conductive response of binary (RC) electrical networks with random arrangements, known as the Universal Dielectric Response (UDR), can be seen as emergent properties of such physical systems. Such arrangements can be used as simple physical prototypes for deriving mathematical formulae for the emergent responses of complex systems.

Weather
Temperature is sometimes used as an example of an emergent macroscopic behaviour. In classical dynamics, a snapshot of the instantaneous momenta of a large number of particles at equilibrium is sufficient to find the average kinetic energy per degree of freedom which is proportional to the temperature. For a small number of particles the instantaneous momenta at a given time are not statistically sufficient to determine the temperature of the system. However, using the ergodic hypothesis, the temperature can still be obtained to arbitrary precision by further averaging the momenta over a long enough time.
Convection 
in a liquid or gas is another example of emergent macroscopic behaviour that makes sense only when considering differentials of temperature. Convection cells, particularly Bénard cells, are an example of a self-organizing system (more specifically, a dissipative system) whose structure is determined both by the constraints of the system and by random perturbations: the possible realizations of the shape and size of the cells depends on the temperature gradient as well as the nature of the fluid and shape of the container, but which configurations are actually realized is due to random perturbations (thus these systems exhibit a form of symmetry breaking).

In some theories of particle physics, even such basic structures as mass, space, and time are viewed as emergent phenomena, arising from more fundamental concepts such as the Higgs boson or strings. In some interpretations of quantum mechanics, the perception of a deterministic reality, in which all objects have a definite position, momentum, and so forth, is actually an emergent phenomenon, with the true state of matter being described instead by a wavefunction which need not have a single position or momentum.
Most of the laws of physics themselves as we experience them today appear to have emerged during the course of time making emergence the most fundamental principle in the universe and raising the question of what might be the most fundamental law of physics from which all others emerged. Chemistry can in turn be viewed as an emergent property of the laws of physics. Biology (including biological evolution) can be viewed as an emergent property of the laws of chemistry. Similarly, psychology could be understood as an emergent property of neurobiological laws. Finally, some economic theories understand economy as an emergent feature of psychology.

According to Laughlin, for many particle systems, nothing can be calculated exactly from the microscopic equations, and macroscopic systems are characterised by broken symmetry: the symmetry present in the microscopic equations is not present in the macroscopic system, due to phase transitions. As a result, these macroscopic systems are described in their own terminology, and have properties that do not depend on many microscopic details. This does not mean that the microscopic interactions are irrelevant, but simply that you do not see them anymore — you only see a renormalized effect of them. Laughlin is a pragmatic theoretical physicist: if you cannot, possibly ever, calculate the broken symmetry macroscopic properties from the microscopic equations, then what is the point of talking about reducibility?

Living, biological systems

Emergence and evolution

Life is a major source of complexity, and evolution is the major process behind the varying forms of life. In this view, evolution is the process describing the growth of complexity in the natural world and in speaking of the emergence of complex living beings and life-forms.

Life is thought to have emerged in the early RNA world when RNA chains began to express the basic conditions necessary for natural selection to operate as conceived by Darwin: heritability, variation of type, and competition for limited resources. Fitness of an RNA replicator (its per capita rate of increase) would likely be a function of adaptive capacities that were intrinsic (in the sense that they were determined by the nucleotide sequence) and the availability of resources. The three primary adaptive capacities may have been (1) the capacity to replicate with moderate fidelity (giving rise to both heritability and variation of type); (2) the capacity to avoid decay; and (3) the capacity to acquire and process resources. These capacities would have been determined initially by the folded configurations of the RNA replicators (see "Ribozyme") that, in turn, would be encoded in their individual nucleotide sequences. Competitive success among different replicators would have depended on the relative values of these adaptive capacities.

Regarding causality in evolution Peter Corning observes:
Synergistic effects of various kinds have played a major causal role in the evolutionary process generally and in the evolution of cooperation and complexity in particular... Natural selection is often portrayed as a "mechanism", or is personified as a causal agency... In reality, the differential "selection" of a trait, or an adaptation, is a consequence of the functional effects it produces in relation to the survival and reproductive success of a given organism in a given environment. It is these functional effects that are ultimately responsible for the trans-generational continuities and changes in nature.

Per his definition of emergence, Corning also addresses emergence and evolution:
[In] evolutionary processes, causation is iterative; effects are also causes. And this is equally true of the synergistic effects produced by emergent systems. In other words, emergence itself... has been the underlying cause of the evolution of emergent phenomena in biological evolution; it is the synergies produced by organized systems that are the key

Swarming is a well-known behaviour in many animal species from marching locusts to schooling fish to flocking birds. Emergent structures are a common strategy found in many animal groups: colonies of ants, mounds built by termites, swarms of bees, shoals/schools of fish, flocks of birds, and herds/packs of mammals.

An example to consider in detail is an ant colony. The queen does not give direct orders and does not tell the ants what to do. Instead, each ant reacts to stimuli in the form of chemical scent from larvae, other ants, intruders, food and buildup of waste, and leaves behind a chemical trail, which, in turn, provides a stimulus to other ants. Here each ant is an autonomous unit that reacts depending only on its local environment and the genetically encoded rules for its variety of ant. Despite the lack of centralized decision making, ant colonies exhibit complex behavior and have even demonstrated the ability to solve geometric problems. For example, colonies routinely find the maximum distance from all colony entrances to dispose of dead bodies.

It appears that environmental factors may play a role in influencing emergence. Research suggests induced emergence of the bee species Macrotera portalis. In this species, the bees emerge in a pattern consistent with rainfall. Specifically, the pattern of emergence is consistent with southwestern deserts' late summer rains and lack of activity in the spring.

Organization of life
A broader example of emergent properties in biology is viewed in the biological organisation of life, ranging from the subatomic level to the entire biosphere. For example, individual atoms can be combined to form molecules such as polypeptide chains, which in turn fold and refold to form proteins, which in turn create even more complex structures. These proteins, assuming their functional status from their spatial conformation, interact together and with other molecules to achieve higher biological functions and eventually create an organism. Another example is how cascade phenotype reactions, as detailed in chaos theory, arise from individual genes mutating respective positioning. At the highest level, all the biological communities in the world form the biosphere, where its human participants form societies, and the complex interactions of meta-social systems.

Emergence of mind
Among the considered phenomena in the evolutionary account of life, as a continuous history, marked by stages at which fundamentally new forms have appeared – the origin of sapiens intelligence. The emergence of mind and its evolution is researched and considered as a separate phenomenon in a special system knowledge called noogenesis.

In humanity

Spontaneous order

Groups of human beings, left free to each regulate themselves, tend to produce spontaneous order, rather than the meaningless chaos often feared. This has been observed in society at least since Chuang Tzu in ancient China. Human beings are the basic elements of social systems, which perpetually interact and create, maintain, or untangle mutual social bonds. Social bonds in social systems are perpetually changing in the sense of the ongoing reconfiguration of their structure. A classic traffic roundabout is also a good example, with cars moving in and out with such effective organization that some modern cities have begun replacing stoplights at problem intersections with roundabouts,  and getting better results. Open-source software and Wiki projects form an even more compelling illustration.

Emergent processes or behaviors can be seen in many other places, such as cities, cabal and market-dominant minority phenomena in economics, organizational phenomena in computer simulations and cellular automata. Whenever there is a multitude of individuals interacting, an order emerges from disorder; a pattern, a decision, a structure, or a change in direction occurs.

Economics
The stock market (or any market for that matter) is an example of emergence on a grand scale. As a whole it precisely regulates the relative security prices of companies across the world, yet it has no leader; when no central planning is in place, there is no one entity which controls the workings of the entire market. Agents, or investors, have knowledge of only a limited number of companies within their portfolio, and must follow the regulatory rules of the market and analyse the transactions individually or in large groupings. Trends and patterns which emerge are studied intensively by technical analysts.

World Wide Web and the Internet
The World Wide Web is a popular example of a decentralized system exhibiting emergent properties. There is no central organization rationing the number of links, yet the number of links pointing to each page follows a power law in which a few pages are linked to many times and most pages are seldom linked to. A related property of the network of links in the World Wide Web is that almost any pair of pages can be connected to each other through a relatively short chain of links. Although relatively well known now, this property was initially unexpected in an unregulated network. It is shared with many other types of networks called small-world networks.

Internet traffic can also exhibit some seemingly emergent properties. In the congestion control mechanism, TCP flows can become globally synchronized at bottlenecks, simultaneously increasing and then decreasing throughput in coordination. Congestion, widely regarded as a nuisance, is possibly an emergent property of the spreading of bottlenecks across a network in high traffic flows which can be considered as a phase transition.

Another important example of emergence in web-based systems is social bookmarking (also called collaborative tagging). In social bookmarking systems, users assign tags to resources shared with other users, which gives rise to a type of information organisation that emerges from this crowdsourcing process. Recent research which analyzes empirically the complex dynamics of such systems has shown that consensus on stable distributions and a simple form of shared vocabularies does indeed emerge, even in the absence of a central controlled vocabulary. Some believe that this could be because users who contribute tags all use the same language, and they share similar semantic structures underlying the choice of words. The convergence in social tags may therefore be interpreted as the emergence of structures as people who have similar semantic interpretation collaboratively index online information, a process called semantic imitation.

Architecture and cities

Emergent structures appear at many different levels of organization or as spontaneous order. Emergent self-organization appears frequently in cities where no planning or zoning entity predetermines the layout of the city. The interdisciplinary study of emergent behaviors is not generally considered a homogeneous field, but divided across its application or problem domains.

Architects may not design all the pathways of a complex of buildings. Instead they might let usage patterns emerge and then place pavement where pathways have become worn, such as a desire path.

The on-course action and vehicle progression of the 2007 Urban Challenge could possibly be regarded as an example of cybernetic emergence. Patterns of road use, indeterministic obstacle clearance times, etc. will work together to form a complex emergent pattern that can not be deterministically planned in advance.

The architectural school of Christopher Alexander takes a deeper approach to emergence, attempting to rewrite the process of urban growth itself in order to affect form, establishing a new methodology of planning and design tied to traditional practices, an Emergent Urbanism. Urban emergence has also been linked to theories of urban complexity and urban evolution.

Building ecology is a conceptual framework for understanding architecture and the built environment as the interface between the dynamically interdependent elements of buildings, their occupants, and the larger environment. Rather than viewing buildings as inanimate or static objects, building ecologist Hal Levin views them as interfaces or intersecting domains of living and non-living systems. The microbial ecology of the indoor environment is strongly dependent on the building materials, occupants, contents, environmental context and the indoor and outdoor climate. The strong relationship between atmospheric chemistry and indoor air quality and the chemical reactions occurring indoors. The chemicals may be nutrients, neutral or biocides for the microbial organisms. The microbes produce chemicals that affect the building materials and occupant health and well-being. Humans manipulate the ventilation, temperature and humidity to achieve comfort with the concomitant effects on the microbes that populate and evolve.

Eric Bonabeau's attempt to define emergent phenomena is through traffic: "traffic jams are actually very complicated and mysterious. On an individual level, each driver is trying to get somewhere and is following (or breaking) certain rules, some legal (the speed limit) and others societal or personal (slow down to let another driver change into your lane). But a traffic jam is a separate and distinct entity that emerges from those individual behaviors. Gridlock on a highway, for example, can travel backward for no apparent reason, even as the cars are moving forward." He has also likened emergent phenomena to the analysis of market trends and employee behavior.

Computer AI
Some artificially intelligent (AI) computer applications simulate emergent behavior. One example is Boids, which mimics the swarming behavior of birds.

Language
It has been argued that the structure and regularity of language grammar, or at least language change, is an emergent phenomenon. While each speaker merely tries to reach their own communicative goals, they use language in a particular way. If enough speakers behave in that way, language is changed. In a wider sense, the norms of a language, i.e. the linguistic conventions of its speech society, can be seen as a system emerging from long-time participation in communicative problem-solving in various social circumstances.

Emergent change processes
Within the field of group facilitation and organization development, there have been a number of new group processes that are designed to maximize emergence and self-organization, by offering a minimal set of effective initial conditions. Examples of these processes include SEED-SCALE, appreciative inquiry, Future Search, the world cafe or knowledge cafe, Open Space Technology, and others (Holman, 2010).

See also

References

Bibliography

 
 
 
 
 Bejan, Adrian; Zane, J. P. (2012). Design in Nature: How the Constructal Law Governs Evolution in Biology, Physics, Technology, and Social Organizations. Doubleday.

Further reading

 Alexander, V. N. (2011). The Biologist’s Mistress: Rethinking Self-Organization in Art, Literature and Nature. Litchfield Park AZ: Emergent Publications.
 
 
 
 Chalmers, David J. (2002). "Strong and Weak Emergence"  Republished in P. Clayton and P. Davies, eds. (2006) The Re-Emergence of Emergence. Oxford: Oxford University Press.
 Philip Clayton & Paul Davies (eds.) (2006). The Re-Emergence of Emergence: The Emergentist Hypothesis from Science to Religion Oxford: Oxford University Press.
 Felipe Cucker and Stephen Smale (2007), The Japanese Journal of Mathematics, The Mathematics of Emergence
 
 
 Hoffmann, Peter M. "Life's Ratchet: How Molecular Machines Extract Order from Chaos" (2012), Basic Books.
 
 
 
 
 
  
 
 
 Ignazio Licata &  Ammar Sakaji (eds) (2008). Physics of Emergence and Organization, World Scientific and Imperial College Press.
 
 
 
 
 
 
 Solé, Ricard and Goodwin, Brian (2000) Signs of life: how complexity pervades biology, Basic Books, New York
 Jakub Tkac & Jiri Kroc (2017), Cellular Automaton Simulation of Dynamic Recrystallization: Introduction into Self-Organization and Emergence (Software) (PDF) Cellular Automaton Simulation of Dynamic Recrystallization: Introduction into Self-Organization and Emergence "Video - Simulation of DRX"
 
 
 architectureofemergence.com

External links

 
 
 
 
 The Emergent Universe: An interactive introduction to emergent phenomena, from ant colonies to Alzheimer's.
 Exploring Emergence: An introduction to emergence using CA and Conway's Game of Life from the MIT Media Lab
 ISCE group: Institute for the Study of Coherence and Emergence.
 Towards modeling of emergence: lecture slides from Helsinki University of Technology
 Biomimetic Architecture – Emergence applied to building and construction
 Studies in Emergent Order: Studies in Emergent Order (SIEO) is an open-access journal
 Emergence
 Emergence – How Stupid Things Become Smart Together – YouTube video by Kurzgesagt – In a Nutshell
 DIEP: Dutch Institute for Emergent Phenomena

 
Chaos theory
Complex systems theory
Concepts in epistemology
Concepts in metaphysics
Consciousness–matter dualism
Metaphysics of mind
Metaphysics of science
Pattern formation